Shape up may refer to:

Shape-Up, a hair style
Shape Ups, generically known as rocker bottom shoe
Shape Up (video game), a 2014 video game
"Shape Up" (Full House), a 1990 episode of Full House
"Shape-Up", a 1971 TV episode of Mission Impossible
Shape Up with Nancy Larson, a TV show on Middle East Television, see List of programs broadcast by Middle East Television
The Shape Up!, a 2009 mixtape by Lil Scrappy, see Lil Scrappy discography
"Shape Up!", a 2010 song on Club 8's album The People's Record
"Shape Up", a 2001 song by Randy's album The Human Atom Bombs

See also
 Shaping Up, the tiltular song by The Sherbs's 1982 album Shaping Up (album)
 Shaping Up, a 1984 American sitcom